Solomon Guramatunhu is a Zimbabwean medical doctor that specializes in the surgical and medical care of the eyes. He attended Waterford Kamhlaba United World College of Southern Africa, obtained his undergraduate medical degrees from the University of Zimbabwe and postgraduate qualifications in ophthalmology from the Royal College of Surgeons of England and the Royal College of Surgeons of Edinburgh.

References

Living people
People from Harare
Zimbabwean ophthalmologists
Waterford Kamhlaba alumni
People educated at a United World College
University of Zimbabwe alumni
Year of birth missing (living people)